Looxahoma is an unincorporated community in Tate County, Mississippi, United States.

Looxahoma is a name derived from the Chickasaw language meaning "red turtle".

References

Unincorporated communities in Tate County, Mississippi
Unincorporated communities in Mississippi
Memphis metropolitan area
Mississippi placenames of Native American origin